Isabelle Funaro (born 16 April 1982 Paris) is a French actress.

She collaborated with Michaël Youn.

Personal life 
In 2000 she married  Pascal Obispo. They had one child. They separated in 2005.

Since 2008, she has been a partner with Michaël Youn; they have two children.

Filmography 

 2002 : Blanche of Bernie Bonvoisin
 2008 : Paris of Cédric Klapisch (scene cut)
 2010 : Fatal of Michaël Youn : Athéna Novotel
 2013 : Vive la France of Michaël Youn : Marianne
 2019 : Rendez-vous chez les Malawa of James Huth

References 

1982 births
21st-century French actresses
Living people
Actresses from Paris